Ivanovka is a rural locality (a selo) in Innokentyevsky Selsoviet of Zavitinsky District, Amur Oblast, Russia. The population was 146 as of 2018. There are 4 streets.

Geography 
Ivanovka is located 29 km southwest of Zavitinsk (the district's administrative centre) by road. Innokentyevka is the nearest rural locality.

References 

Rural localities in Zavitinsky District